Tales of Hoffmann is a 1916 silent German drama film directed by Richard Oswald. An incomplete print is held in the collection of the Friedrich Wilhelm Murnau Foundation.

Cast
 as young Hoffmann
Max Ruhbeck as Uncle
Paula Ronay as Aunt
Werner Krauss as Conte Dapertutto
Friedrich Kühne as Coppelius, eyeglass merchant
Lupu Pick as Spalanzani, Museum Director
 as Councillor Crespel
 as Mrs Crespel
Ruth Oswald as little Antonia
 as Dr. Mirakel
Erich Kaiser-Titz as E. T. A. Hoffmann
Ferdinand Bonn as Municipal Councillor Lindorf
 as Actress
Alice Hechy as Olympia, Automaton (as Alice Scheel-Hechy)
 as Giulietta
 as Schlemihl
Ressel Orla

References

External links

1916 drama films
1910s fantasy drama films
German fantasy drama films
Films of the German Empire
German silent feature films
Films directed by Richard Oswald
German black-and-white films
Films based on works by E. T. A. Hoffmann
Biographical films about writers
Films set in the 1800s
Films set in the 1810s
Films based on operas
Films based on The Sandman (short story)
Silent drama films
1910s German films